Lee Hsi-ming, also known as Lee Hsi-min, is an admiral of the Republic of China (Taiwan), now currently serves as the senior research fellow of the Project 2049 Institute at Washington, D.C.

His major assignments includes the Chief of the General Staff (since 2017), Vice Minister (Policy) of National Defense (from 2016 to 2017), and Commander of the Republic of China Navy (ROCN, from 2015 to 2016). In June 2019, Lee was awarded the Order of the Cloud and Banner with Special Grand Cordon. He retired on 1 July 2019. Lee graduated from the 1977 class of the ROC Naval Academy and the 1998 class of the U.S. Naval War College.

References

External links
Greetings From Admiral Lee Hsi-Min, Chief of Navy, Republic of China Navy

Naval War College alumni
Living people
1955 births
National Defense University (Republic of China) alumni
Republic of China Navy admirals